From Danger to Dignity: The Fight for Safe Abortion is a 1995 documentary film directed by filmmaker, Dorothy Fadiman. The film weaves together two parallel stories: the evolution of underground networks that helped women find safe abortions outside the law, and the intensive efforts by activists and legislators to decriminalize abortion through legislative and judicial channels. This film combines rare archival footage with interviews that document the courageous efforts of those who fought to break the silence, change the laws and end the shame which surrounded abortion when it was a crime. The film is the second of the Abortion Rights Film Trilogy.

The film features interviews with Dr. Jane Elizabeth Hodgson, Pat Maginnis, Constance Cook, Sarah Weddington, and archival footage featuring George M. Michaels.

Reception

Booklist called the film "A sterling documentary."

External links 
 
 From Danger to Dignity: The Fight for Safe Abortion at vimeo.com
 From Danger to Dignity: The Fight for Safe Abortion  at archive.org
 From Danger to Dignity: The Fight for Safe Abortion  on imdb.com
   The page for From Danger to Dignity from the New York Times
 Documenting Danger and Dignity  Palo Alto Weekly, March 1995
 The film's page  from Women Make Movies

References

1995 films
American documentary films
Films directed by Dorothy Fadiman
Documentary films about abortion
1990s English-language films
1990s American films